The Indian Paintbrush Book Award is an award given annually to books nominated and voted on by children in the fourth, fifth, and sixth grades in Wyoming. The award was first given in 1986. The award is sponsored by the Wyoming Library Association and the Wyoming State Reading Council.

The criteria for the award are:

The book may be fiction or nonfiction
The book must have been published within the past two years and must still be in print 
Any student may nominate a book
No book may be nominated two consecutive years
No book by a winning author may appear on the following year's list.

Winners

References

American children's literary awards
Awards established in 1986
1986 establishments in Wyoming
Wyoming education-related lists
Wyoming culture
100101010101101010101010